Halcyon Days is the eighth studio album by American singer and pianist Bruce Hornsby. The album, recorded with his touring band the Noisemakers, was released in 2004. It was Hornsby's first release with Columbia Records. One song, "What The Hell Happened", has been described as a rare example of the use of bitonality in a pop piece.

The album marked a return to a more acoustic, piano-driven sound that reviewers described as "pure Hornsby". Guests included Sting, Elton John and Eric Clapton.  The tracks "Gonna Be Some Changes Made,"  "Candy Mountain Run," "Dreamland," and "Circus On The Moon" became concert staples, each showcasing the diversity of Hornsby's improvisations and the Noisemakers' live sound. Notably, Halcyon Days also includes a suite of solo piano songs—"What The Hell Happened," "Hooray For Tom," and "Heir Gordon"—which all have a "Randy Newman pastiche."  Although the album was markedly less-risk-taking than Big Swing Face, it would be well-received as a "winning balance of [Hornsby's] tuneful and adventurous sides."

"Gonna Be Some Changes Made" was used in several Lowe's commercials from 2006.

Track listing
All songs written by Bruce Hornsby.

 "Gonna Be Some Changes Made" - 5:18
 "Candy Mountain Run" (with Eric Clapton) - 5:15
 "Dreamland" (duet with Elton John) - 5:05
 "Circus on the Moon" - 6:32
 "Halcyon Days" (duet with Sting) - 5:57
 "What the Hell Happened" - 4:22
 "Hooray for Tom" - 3:56
 "Heir Gordon" - 4:24
 "Mirror on the Wall" - 5:41
 "Song F" - 4:13
 "Lost in the Snow" - 5:08

Musicians 
 Bruce Hornsby – vocals, acoustic piano, keyboards
 John "J. T." Thomas – organ
 Eric Clapton – guitar (1, 2, 5), vocals (2)
 R. S. Hornsby – guitar (2, 9)
 Doug Derryberry – guitar (4)
 Wayne Pooley – guitar (5, 9)
 J. V. Collier – bass
 Sonny Emory – drums
 Bonny Bonaparte – percussion (4)
 Bobby Read – clarinet (4, 6, 8, 11)
 Sting – vocals (1, 5)
 Elton John – vocals (3)
 Lloyd Johns – backing vocals (3)
 Woody Green – backing vocals (3)
 Ralph Payne – backing vocals (3)
 Donnie Struckey – backing vocals (3)

Orchestra (on "Dreamland", "Hooray for Tom" and  "Lost in the Snow")
 Peter Harris – orchestra arrangements (3, 7)
 John "J. T." Thomas – orchestra arrangements (11)
 Kurt Muroki and Satosh Okamoto – double bass 
 Elizabeth Dyson, Jeanne LeBlanc, Elieen Moon and Sarah Seiver – cello
 David Creswell, Karen Dreyfus, Dawn Hannay, Vivek Kamath, Sue Prey and Robert Reinhart – viola 
 Duoming Ba, Maryia Borozina, Jeanne Ingraham, Lisa Kim, Myung-Hi Kim, Sarah Kim, Soohyun Kwon, Matt Lehmann, Ayano Ninomiya, Suzanne Ornstein, Sandra Park, Dan Reed, Michael Roth, Laura Seaton, Fiona Simon, Paul Woodiel, Sharon Yamada and Jung Sun Yoo – violin

Production
 Producers – Bruce Hornsby and Wayne Pooley
 A&R – Lennie Meat
 Production Coordination – Moonie Geiger
 Engineer – Wayne Pooley
 Additional Engineering – Simon Climie, Alan Douglas, Brian Garten, Kevin Halpin and Matt Still.
 Recorded at Tossington Sound (Williamsburg, VA).
 Additional Recording at Olympic Studios (London, UK), Right Track Recording (New York City, NY) and Silent Sound Studios (Atlanta, GA).
 Pro Tools at Olympic Studios by Simon Climie.
 Mixed by Bruce Hornsby and Dagle
 Additional mixing on "Gonna Be Some Changes Made" by Tony Maserati.
 Mastered by Ted Jensen at Sterling Sound (New York City, NY).
 Production Assistance – Patti Oates Martin
 Art Direction – Dave Bett
 Logo Design – Jay Flom
 Photography – Sean Smith
 Management – John Scher
 Enthusiast – Al Hilbert
 Cfo – Melissa Reagan
 Roadcrew – Peter Banta, Gary Chrosniak, Caldwell Gray and Wayne Pooley.

Charts

References

2004 albums
Bruce Hornsby albums
Columbia Records albums